Scopula loxographa is a moth of the family Geometridae. It was described by Turner in 1941. It is found in Australia (Queensland).

References

Moths described in 1941
loxographa
Moths of Australia